Mouse Hunt is a 1997 American slapstick black comedy film written by Adam Rifkin and directed by Gore Verbinski in his feature film directorial debut. It stars Nathan Lane, Lee Evans, Maury Chaykin, and Christopher Walken. The film follows two Laurel and Hardy-like brothers in their struggle against one small but crafty house mouse for possession of a mansion which was willed to them by their father. While the film is set in the late 20th century, styles range humorously from the 1940s to the 1990s. It was the first family film to be released by DreamWorks Pictures, who released it in the United States on December 19, 1997, to mixed reviews but was a commercial success.

This was one of William Hickey's final roles before he died, and the film was dedicated in memory of him.

Plot
When the once-wealthy string magnate Rudolf Smuntz dies, he leaves his factory and an abandoned Victorian mansion to his two sons: the dutiful and optimistic Lars, and venal cynic Ernie, who has ignored the family business to become a chef; he walks out of the reading of their father's will, taking a box of cigars. At Ernie's restaurant, a cockroach crawls out of the box of cigars and into a dish prepared for the mayor, causing him to have a heart attack when he accidentally bites into it and is taken away in an ambulance. Shortly after the mayor dies, Ernie's restaurant, Chez Ernie, is condemned and scheduled for demolition, costing Ernie his career and home in the process. Meanwhile, a cord company called Zeppco International offers Lars a buyout for the string factory, but then remembers that he promised his father never to sell it and refuses. Lars's wife, April, is furious and kicks him out. With nowhere else to go, the brothers spend the night in the mansion.

The brothers cannot sleep due to noises caused by a mouse, and while investigating find blueprints of the property. The blueprints reveal that the mansion was the final design of a famous architect, Charles Lyle LaRue, and it would be worth a fortune if restored. The brothers decide to renovate and auction the mansion to recover their lives. Ernie, fearing a repeat of the cockroach incident, convinces Lars they must also get rid of the mouse. Conventional methods fail when the mouse demonstrates itself to be exceptionally intelligent. The brothers resort to extreme measures to remove the mouse, including buying a monstrous Maine Coon cat named "Catzilla" and hiring an eccentric exterminator named Caesar; the mouse drops Catzilla to his death in a dumbwaiter, and traumatizes Caesar by dragging him through the mansion using his truck's winch line.

Ernie had borrowed against the mansion's mortgage to pay for an unnecessary addition as part of the renovation. As the bank informs them that they will be evicted in two days unless they pay, they know that with their limited funds, the brothers cannot pay their workers, causing them to go on strike. Ernie finds Zeppco's business card and arranges a meeting to secretly accept their buyout offer. After Lars accidentally loses his clothes to several machines while trying to run the factory alone, he is met by April, who has learned of the mansion's value and takes Lars back, giving him the funds they need. Ernie then misses his meeting with Zeppco's representatives when he attempts to impress some women and is hit by a bus. The brothers return to the mansion only to witness a now-insane Caesar being taken away by paramedics.

Realizing the mouse's intelligence, the brothers become more desperate to kill him. Ernie chases the mouse with a shotgun and accidentally shoots a bug bomb Caesar had dropped, blowing a massive hole in the floor and sending him and Lars tumbling. As the brothers recover from the blast, Zeppco calls and leaves a message, saying they have taken back their proposal since Lars declined their offer and Ernie never showed up for the meeting. Angry at each other for the deceptions, the brothers get into a heated argument. Lars throws an orange at Ernie, which misses Ernie but hits the mouse, who is stunned but still alive. The brothers cannot bring themselves to kill the mouse and mail him in a box addressed to Fidel Castro. The brothers reconcile and finish their renovations. The night of the auction, Lars discovers the postal box returned due to insufficient postage and a hole chewed in it, while Ernie sees the mouse on his podium as he gives a speech. As the auction begins, the brothers attempt to flush the mouse out with a garden hose, filling an inner wall of the mansion with water until it bursts, washing the bidders out and causing the estate to collapse. As April leaves with a wealthy bidder and the other bidders, the brothers are left with nothing, but take solace in that the collapse indeed killed the mouse when Rudolf's lucky string (the last thing he gave the brothers before he passed, and which the mouse had eaten before the auction began) falls from the sky. Lars picks it up, but when Ernie tries to take it, it splits in two, which was against Rudolf's dying wish for them to share the string forever, shocking them both.

Dejected, the brothers spend the night in the factory, unaware that the mouse has survived, and followed them. Seeing their sorry state, the mouse takes pity on them and activates the factory's machinery, dropping a block of cheese into the wax boiler to produce a ball of string cheese. Inspired, the brothers end their battle with the mouse and renovate the factory to produce string cheese and other cheese-based products. Lars (now having formed a relationship with a Belgian model named Hilde) runs the factory with Ernie as his chef and the mouse as their taste-tester for new cheese combinations. The film ends with a shot of Rudolf's lucky string framed and with a plaque underneath it saying his motto: "A world without string is chaos."

Cast
 Nathan Lane as Ernie Smuntz, a man who refused heirdom to his father's string factory to become a chef.
 Lee Evans as Lars Smuntz, Ernie's brother and the heir to their father's string factory.
 Maury Chaykin as Alexander Falko, a wealthy LaRue collector.
 Christopher Walken as Caesar, an odd and eccentric exterminator hired by the Smuntz brothers to rid them of the mouse.
 Vicki Lewis as April Smuntz, Lars' money-hungry former wife.
 William Hickey as Rudolf Smuntz, a string magnate and the late father of Ernie and Lars.
 Eric Christmas as Ernie and Lars' lawyer.
 Michael Jeter as Quincy Thorpe, a LaRue historian.
 Cliff Emmich as Mayor McKrinkle.
 Debra Christofferson as Ingrid, a Belgian model.
 Camilla Søeberg as Hilde, a Belgian model.
 Ian Abercrombie as the auctioneer.
 Annabelle Gurwitch as Roxanne Atkins, a photographer.
 Eric Poppick as Theodore Plumb, the banker.
 Ernie Sabella as Maury, a worker at the cat shelter.
 Jack Angeles as Kennel Employee
 Frank Welker as Catzilla (animal vocal effects, uncredited).

Release 
Mouse Hunt was released in North America on December 19, 1997, then in the United Kingdom on April 3, 1998.

Home media 
Mouse Hunt was originally released on VHS on May 5, 1998, and DVD on December 8, 1998, by DreamWorks Home Entertainment.  It was released on Blu-ray on February 2, 2021, by Paramount Home Entertainment.

Reception
Mouse Hunt received mixed reviews from film critics. Rotten Tomatoes reports that 44% of 33 critics had given the film a positive review. The critic consensus reads: "Mouse Hunt gets trapped under the weight of its excessive slapstick antics." On Metacritic, the film has a score of 54 out of 100 based on reviews from 21 critics, indicating "mixed or average reviews". Audiences polled by CinemaScore gave the film an average grade of "B" on an A+ to F scale. Roger Ebert gave the film two stars, calling it "not very funny, and maybe couldn't have been very funny no matter what, because the pieces for comedy are not in place... A comedy that hasn't assigned sympathy to some characters and made others hateful cannot expect to get many laughs, because the audience doesn't know who to laugh at, or with." Though partner Gene Siskel liked the film.

Regarding the digital special effects, Ebert deemed the film "an excellent example of the way modern advances in special effects can sabotage a picture (Titanic is an example of effects being used wisely). Because it is possible to make a movie in which the mouse can do all sorts of clever things, the filmmakers have assumed incorrectly that it would be funny to see the mouse doing them."

Nonetheless, the film was a financial success, partially due to releasing during the Christmas and New Years period. It was released on December 19, 1997, opening in North America at #4 and grossing $6,062,922 in its opening weekend, averaging $2,817 from 2,152 theaters. In its second weekend, it stayed at #4 and increased by 60 percent, making $9,702,770, averaging $4,428 from 2,191 theaters, and bringing its 10-day gross to $21,505,569. In its third weekend, it once again stayed at #4 and dropped by only 13 percent, making $8,418,001, averaging $3,804 from 2,213 theaters, and bringing its 17-day gross to $40,021,527. It closed on July 1, 1998, with a final gross of $61,917,389 in the North American market and $60,500,000 in other territories for a worldwide total of $122,417,389. Its budget was $38 million. The film was released in the United Kingdom on April 3, 1998, and opened at #2, behind Titanic.

See also

 List of American films of 1997

References

External links

 
 
 
 
 
 

1997 films
1997 comedy films
1997 directorial debut films
1990s black comedy films
American children's comedy films
American black comedy films
American screwball comedy films
American slapstick comedy films
Films about mice and rats
Films about cats
Films about death
Films about brothers
Films set in country houses
American films about revenge
Films directed by Gore Verbinski
Films scored by Alan Silvestri
DreamWorks Pictures films
Animal Logic films
1990s English-language films
Films produced by Bruce Cohen
1990s American films